Nsalaga is an administrative ward in the Mbeya Urban district of the Mbeya Region of Tanzania. In 2016 the Tanzania National Bureau of Statistics report there were 20,933 people in the ward, from 18,993 in 2012.

Neighborhoods 
The ward has 7 neighborhoods.
 Igamba
 Itezi Mashariki
 Itezi Mlimani
 Kibonde Nyasi
 Majengo mapya
 Nsalaga
 Ntundu

References 

Wards of Mbeya Region